The Danbury Mint is a division of MBI, Inc. that markets a variety of collectibles. Danbury Mint historically marketed high quality medals and ingots produced by others exclusively for them. The company also sold numerous other collectible offering including plates, bells, sculptures, etc. Danbury Mint is well known for its 1:24 scale die-cast vehicles, including a now discontinued James Bond's DB5.

Their licenses include: Boyds, Coca-Cola, John Deere, Dept 56, Dr. Seuss, General Motors, Goebel, King Features, Looney Tunes, Major League Baseball, Mars, Inc., NFL, Gary Patterson, Peanuts, Pillsbury, Elvis Presley, Red Hat Society, The Walt Disney Company and Twentieth Century Fox Film Corporation. Products include commemorative coins, jewelry, sports collectibles, and Christmas ornaments.

History
The Danbury Mint was founded in Westport, Connecticut, by Ralph Glendinning and Ted Stanley in 1969, as a subsidiary of Glendinning Companies. Their first product was a series of medals commemorating the Apollo 11 moon landing.

The Danbury Mint has since created many commemorative items—figurines, collector plates, dolls, die-cast cars, etc.—based on historical events and people. Examples include, Shirley Temple, Princess Diana, Barack Obama's inauguration, Corvettes, Hummel figurines, and gold Christmas ornaments.

Danbury's first sister division was formed in 1970 under the name Postal Commemorative Society, changed to PCS Stamps & Coins in 2006 to reflect a shift in the product mix from stamps to coin related products. In 1973, both divisions were incorporated as MBI. In 1975 Easton Press was formed as MBI's third division, and MBI was spun off from Glendinning Companies as a separate company.

Philanthropy 
Over half of the Danbury Mint's profits support mental health research. The Stanley Family Foundation is the majority shareholder of the company. This charitable organization funds research that would reduce the burden of serious mental illness. Top scientists in the field of genetics, stem cell biology and neurobiology rely on funding from The Stanley Family Foundation to finance their research.

References

External links
 Danbury Mint homepage

Coin retailers
Model manufacturers of the United States
American companies established in 1969
Companies based in Norwalk, Connecticut